The UCF Knights men's soccer team represents the University of Central Florida in National Collegiate Athletics Association (NCAA) Division I. As of the next NCAA men's soccer season in 2023, the Knights compete in the Sun Belt Conference (SBC). This coincides with UCF's July 2023 move from the American Athletic Conference (The American), a league in which it has been a member since 2013, to the Big 12 Conference, which sponsors soccer only for women. They play their home games on UCF's main campus in Orlando, Florida at the UCF Soccer and Track Stadium. The Knights are currently led by head coach Scott Calabrese.

After UCF announced its move to the Big 12, it was forced to find a new home for men's soccer, as the Big 12 sponsors that sport only for women.  School officials expected to join the SBC, which reinstated men's soccer for the 2022 season with a lineup that significantly included the only then-current Big 12 member with a men's soccer program (West Virginia) and both Southeastern Conference schools that sponsor varsity men's soccer (Kentucky and South Carolina). This was confirmed on June 21, 2022, when the SBC officially announced UCF's 2023 arrival as a men's soccer member.

History
The Knights soccer program began in 1975 under Jim Rudy. The Knights went 10–4–1 that year, defeating St. Leo in their first match 8–0. In 1984, the team made the move to Division I. The Knights were nationally ranked for the first time during the 2010 season, and rose to a program high of No. 8 during the 2011 season.

The Knights have an all-time record of 332–259–51 (86–71–17).

Stadium
The Knights play their home games at the UCF Soccer and Track Stadium which is a part of Knights Plaza, located on the north end of UCF's main campus in Orlando, Florida. The soccer field is made of natural grass and measures  x .

In 2011, the stadium was heavily renovated, boasting a 2,000 seat capacity with a new 1,475-seat stand, press box,  clubhouse, restrooms and new entrance on the west side of the facility. The original 500-seat stand was retained as a visitors' stand.

Roster

Coaches

Seasons

Alumni
UCF has produced a number of notable soccer stars. Most notably, Eric Vasquez, Sean Johnson and Ryan McIntosh. Vasquez, who made his professional soccer debut with the Columbus Crew in Major League Soccer, later played for Miami FC in the United Soccer Leagues' First Division and the Orlando Sharks of the Major Indoor Soccer League before retiring due to injury. Former Knights Goalkeeper Ryan McIntosh initially played with D.C. United, and after a year with the D.C. United Reserve team, McIntosh signed with the Atlanta Silverbacks of USL Division One, where he led the team to the league final. Both players were a part of the 2004 Central Florida Kraze amateur soccer team that won the Premier Development League's championship by defeating the Boulder Rapids Resevers, 1–0 at the UCF soccer stadium.
In 2019, two of players got selected in the MLS SuperDraft that took place in Chicago.Striker Cal Jennings was picked number 15th in the first round by the FC Dallas and Defender Jonathan Dean got selected 32nd in the second round of the draft by Orlando City Soccer Club.

Sean Johnson, another former UCF goalkeeper, joined the Chicago Fire of Major League Soccer in 2010. He was a member of the United States U-20 men's national soccer team which qualified for the 2009 FIFA U-20 World Cup in Egypt.

See also
 UCF Knights women's soccer
 List of University of Central Florida alumni

References

External links
 

 
Soccer clubs in Florida
1975 establishments in Florida